Pajtim Kasami (born 2 June 1992) is a Swiss professional footballer who plays as a midfielder for Super League Greece club  Olympiacos.

Early career
Born in Zürich, Switzerland to an ethnic Albanian family from Struga, North Macedonia, Kasami started his career in 2003 with Swiss club Winterthur before he joined Grasshoppers in Zürich in 2006. In the same year, he also briefly played for Liverpool on loan. On 2 February 2009, at age 16, he moved to Lazio in the Italian Serie A. At the start of the 2009–10 season, Kasami was reported absent without leave and was due to play for the reserves that season.

Club career

Bellinzona
In December 2009, Kasami returned to Switzerland to play for Bellinzona, signing a contract until 2011. He made his professional debut in March after his free transfer was cleared by Swiss Football Association. Lazio terminated his contract after Kasami failed to appear on several training sessions in the youth teams or first team, and it was due to his indiscipline that Lazio did not want to buy his rights from Grasshopper.

Palermo
On 7 June 2010, Palermo announced they had signed the midfielder in a five-year contract from Bellinzona. Despite his young age, he was immediately included in the first team and made his debut with a rosanero jersey as a second-half substitute in the first leg of the 2010–11 UEFA Europa League play-off against Maribor. He then made his Serie A debut later on 30 August, playing the entire home league game against Cagliari, which ended in a 0–0 draw. He concluded the season with 24 appearances: 14 in the league, 8 in Europa League and 2 in Coppa Italia. Zamparini hailed Kasami as "the new Pastore".

Fulham
On 25 July 2011, Kasami signed for Fulham on a four-year deal for an undisclosed fee. He made his début for Fulham as a late substitute in the 0–0 draw in their Europa League clash with RNK Split. He was later in the starting line-up versus Dnipro on 18 August 2011, playing for 88 minutes and was greatly involved in the set up of all the 3 goals. Kasami made his Premier League début on 21 August 2011 against Wolverhampton Wanderers at the Molineux Stadium. Fulham lost the match 2–0.

Kasami almost joined Pescara on loan on 1 January 2013, but the move could not be finalised in time due to a bad internet connection. Kasami joined Luzern on loan until the end of the 2012–13 season on 15 February 2013. He made his debut in the 4–0 away defeat to St. Gallen on 24 February 2013. He scored his first goal for Luzern in the 4–3 away victory over Servette FC in the final game of the 2012–13 season on 1 June 2013. Following his loan spell with Luzern came to an end, Manager Martin Jol revealed Kasami took a fifty per cent cut of his wage to stay at the club. He scored Fulham's first goal of the 2013–14 Premier League season in a 1–0 away victory against Sunderland. Kasami then scored his second goal of the season against Crystal Palace on 21 October; a dipping volley from the edge of the area, in a match that eventually ended a 4–1 away win to Fulham. This goal was nominated for the FIFA Puskás Award for the best goal of the year, the only one nominated from the Premier League. A third was added with a deflected free kick in a 2–1 win at Norwich on 26 December 2013.

Olympiacos
It was announced on 9 July 2014 that Kasami had signed for Olympiacos for a fee of €5 million. On 23 August 2014, he netted his first goal in his official debut as a player of Olympiacos in a 3–1 home win against Niki Volou. He scored again on 30 August 2014 against Panetolikos in a 1–1 away draw.

On 22 October 2014, Olympiacos pulled off one of the surprises of the Champions League night when they beat Juventus 1–0 in Piraeus with a first-half goal from Kasami. On 22 February 2015, Kasami experienced one of the most traumatic shocks in his life after the derby against Panathinaikos. On 11 March 2015, Olympiakos's Portuguese coach Vitor Pereira and Kasami were fined for their behavior after the team's Greek Cup quarter-final 1–0 win over AEK Athens. The disciplinary committee of the Greek soccer federation fined Pereira €9,000 and Kasami was ordered to pay €7,000 for making gestures to the crowd which incited trouble.

After a successful 2014–15, which ended with double conquest, several reports in Italy are keep insisting that Kasami was likely to move to a Serie A club and it is believed that Fiorentina or Inter were the most favourable destination. Despite serious interest from Fiorentina, Bayer Leverkusen and lately from Roma, Kasami did not complete his transfer on the deadline day. He scored his first goal for the 2015–16 season in a hammering 5–1 win against PAS Giannina.

On 2 October 2015, media source stated that Olympiacos' former manager Vitor Pereira and midfielder Kasami were prosecuted for provoking episodes in the Greek Cup semi final against AEK Athens. The Deputy Prosecutor Giorgos Lainis prosecuted Kasami and Vitor Pereira. Αt the same time, the Football prosecutor former Sports Prosecutor Konstantinos Simitzglou had begun preliminary examination by calling witnesses in order to combine his case with the prosecution. The two men were close to facing criminal responsibilities and even go to trial. On 9 June 2017, Kasami was sentenced to eight months in prison (on parole) for their behavior. The Swiss-Albanian international central midfielder were punished by the Greek Justice for offensively provoking the supporters of AEK after the end of 2014–15 Greek Cup quarter final (0–1) between the two teams in the Olympic Stadium of Athens, after the lawsuit filed by the fan of home side, Christos Garifallou, and supported by their legal department.

Nottingham Forest
On 3 August 2016, Kasami became Nottingham Forest's seventh signing of the summer when he joined the reds on a twelve-month loan deal from Olympiacos. On 27 August 2016, he scored his first goal for the club in a 3–1 home win against Leeds United.
According to English sources, Kasami had expressed his wish to return to Olympiacos in January transfer window. The former Fulham star failed to hit the heights that were expected of him when brought to Nottingham by French manager Philippe Montanier, who had since been sacked. On 14 February 2017, Kasami's half-volley gave Forest an early lead in a 3–2 away loss against Fulham On 5 May 2017, Nottingham Forest announced that Kasami had returned to Olympiacos.

Sion
On 31 August 2017, Kasami signed a three year contract with Swiss club FC Sion for an undisclosed fee.
During the 2018–19 season Kasami scored eight goals and made three assists in 20 appearances for Sion and as a result became the subject of transfer interest from Crystal Palace and Turkish club Fenerbahçe as well as fellow Swiss team FC Basel.

On 20 March 2020, FC Sion's president Christian Constantin terminated the contracts of all players without notice after they failed to agree to an 80% salary pay cut during coronavirus pandemic. Players such as Pajtim Kasami, Johan Djourou and Alex Song among others, wished to secure themselves legally with lawyers before agreeing to sign.

Basel
According to various news, Italian Serie A club Venezia F.C. had officially moved for the acquisition of the Swiss ex-international Kasami, however, the move never came into fruition. On 12 October 2020, FC Basel announced that Kasami joined them on a two-year deal. Kasami joined Basel's first team for their 2020–21 season under head coach Ciriaco Sforza. After playing in one test game Kasami played his domestic league debut for his new club in the away game in the Kybunpark on 1 November 2020. He scored his first goal for the team in the same game, it was the last goal in the game, as Basel won 3–1 against St. Gallen. He immediately became a regular starter, playing 32 games, scoring 12 in his first season. At the beginning of his second season with the club he was also regular starter under new head coach Patrick Rahmen, but then after the winter break and following the change of trainer to Guillermo Abascal, Kasami was used mainly as substitute. Kasami left Basel after his contract expired. During his period with the club Kasaim played a total of 92 games for Basel scoring a total of 23 goals. 65 of these games were in the Swiss Super League, 1 in the Swiss Cup, 13 in the UEFA Europa Conference League and 13 were friendly games. He scored 16 goals in the domestic league, 2 in the Conference League and the other 4 were scored during the test games.

International career
Kasami was part of the Swiss under-17 team that won the 2009 World Cup. Whilst at Bellinzona, he earned a call-up to the Switzerland U21 team along with teammates Alessandro Ciarrocchi and Frank Feltscher, making his debut against Georgia U21 on 30 May 2010. Kasami was selected to represent Switzerland in the men's football tournament at the 2012 Summer Olympics as part of the Swiss under-23 team. He played over 90 minutes in all three games in the tournament, but the team were knocked out, finishing in fourth position of their Group. He made his debut for the Swiss senior team in a 1–0 win against Slovenia on 15 October 2013 and scored his first goal on 15 November 2013 in a friendly 2–1 defeat against South Korea. He scored his first competitive goal against San Marino to put Switzerland up 5–0 in an eventual 7–0 win.

Career statistics

Club

International goals
Scores and results list Switzerland's goal tally first.

Honours

Club
Olympiacos
Super League Greece: 2014–15, 2015–16
Greek Cup: 2014–15; runner-up: 2015–16

International
Switzerland U17
FIFA U-17 World Cup: 2009

References

External links

Switzerland profile

1992 births
Living people
Footballers from Zürich
Swiss men's footballers
Switzerland youth international footballers
Switzerland under-21 international footballers
Footballers at the 2012 Summer Olympics
Olympic footballers of Switzerland
Swiss expatriate footballers
Swiss Super League players
Swiss Challenge League players
Serie A players
Premier League players
Super League Greece players
Liverpool F.C. players
Grasshopper Club Zürich players
S.S. Lazio players
AC Bellinzona players
Palermo F.C. players
Fulham F.C. players
FC Luzern players
Olympiacos F.C. players
Nottingham Forest F.C. players
FC Sion players
FC Basel players
Association football midfielders
Expatriate footballers in England
Expatriate footballers in Italy
Swiss people of Albanian descent
Swiss people of Macedonian descent
Swiss expatriate sportspeople in Italy
Swiss expatriate sportspeople in England
Switzerland international footballers